"Oh Lonesome Me" is a popular song written and recorded in December 1957 by Don Gibson with Chet Atkins producing it for RCA Victor in Nashville. Released in 1958, the song topped the country chart for eight non-consecutive weeks. On what became the Billboard Hot 100, it peaked at No. 7. It was Gibson's only Top 10 hit on the pop chart. Its B-side was "I Can't Stop Loving You", which peaked at No. 7 on the C&W Jockey charts and became a standard song about unrequited love.
The vocal backings on both songs were provided by the Jordanaires.

The Kentucky Headhunters version
The song was covered by The Kentucky Headhunters in 1990. Their version went to number 8, which was the band's highest-peaking single.

Chart performance

Year-end charts

Cover versions
1959: Elvis Presley Elvis made a relaxed version of this song in December 1958, while performing military service in Germany, during his stay at the Hotel Grünewald, Bad Nauheim, where he resided.
1959: Sacha Distel made a French version  "Oh ! Quelle Nuit (Lonesome Me)".
1960: Bob Luman's version reached #105 on the U.S. Billboard Pop chart
1961: Johnny Cash (went to #13)
1962: Craig Douglas released a cover version in the UK on Decca Records under the production of Bunny Lewis. Douglas' version entered the UK singles chart on October 20, 1962, stayed there for twelve weeks and the best position was at #11
1962: Connie Francis - included in her album Connie Francis Sings Great Country Hits
1962: Kay Starr included in her album Just Plain Country
1962: Ray Charles for his album Modern Sounds in Country and Western Music Volume Two
1962: Larry Finnegan as a single
1963: The Everly Brothers for their album The Everly Brothers Sing Great Country Hits
1964: Eydie Gormé for her album Gormé Country Style
 1965: Lou Monte: On the flipside of the single "Paul Revere's Horse"
1965: Per Myrberg Swedish version named "Stackars Mej"
1965: Skeeter Davis - included in her album Written by the Stars
1965: Bing Crosby - included in his album Bing Crosby Sings the Great Country Hits
1965: The Beau Brummels - on the album Introducing the Beau Brummels
1966: Bobbi Martin's version reached #134 on the U.S. Billboard Pop chart and #64 Country
1967: Nancy Sinatra, - Country, My Way
1970: Stonewall Jackson (went to #63)
1970: Neil Young (slower version, on After the Gold Rush)
1975: Ray Stevens (on album Misty)
1975: Loggins and Messina on their album So Fine (Loggins and Messina album)
1978: Loretta Lynn on episode 308 of The Muppet Show
1982: Sammy Davis Jr. on the album What I Got on My Mind
1990: Kentucky Headhunters as a single.
1992: Mexican Banda group Banda Vallarta Show covered this song in Spanish.  This version is named "Oh Solitario" which is part of their Esa Chica Me Vacila album
2000: Anna Fermin's Trigger Gospel, on compilation album Down to the Promised Land: 5 Years of Bloodshot Records
2002: Anne Murray - including in her album Country Croonin'
2003: Tony Christie - recorded for his album Country Roads
2007: Southern Culture on the Skids - on their album Countrypolitan Favorites
2009: M. Ward included in the album Hold Time
2017: The Tracks - on the album Live at the Lost Horse: Music from "I Love Dick"
2023: Van Morrison - on the album Moving on Skiffle

References

1957 songs
1958 singles
1962 singles
1990 singles
Don Gibson songs
Ray Price (musician) songs
Johnny Cash songs
Larry Finnegan songs
Neil Young songs
Stonewall Jackson (musician) songs
We Five songs
Loggins and Messina songs
Lucinda Williams songs
The Kentucky Headhunters songs
Song recordings produced by Chet Atkins
Billboard Hot Country Songs number-one singles of the year
Music videos directed by John Lloyd Miller
RCA Victor singles
Columbia Records singles
Mercury Records singles
Rockabilly songs
Songs written by Don Gibson